Nambour Plaza is a sub-regional shopping centre located in Nambour on the Sunshine Coast, Queensland. The 11,282 square metre centre includes anchor tenants, Woolworths and Big W and 40 speciality stores.

Nambour Central 
Neighbouring the plaza is Nambour Central, a small 3,196sqm community shopping mall with about 5 retailers. Above the mall is also an office suite.

References

Shopping centres on the Sunshine Coast, Queensland